WXXI-FM (91.5 MHz) is a public, listener-supported radio station in Rochester, New York, airing a classical music radio format. Its programs can also be heard in Houghton on WXXY 90.3 FM and also on a digital subchannel of WXXI-TV on 22.7.  They are owned by the WXXI Public Broadcasting Council, which also owns WXXI-TV, WRUR-FM and news/information-formatted AM station WXXI 1370 AM.  WXXI-FM holds periodic fundraisers on the air to support the station.

WXXI-FM has an effective radiated power (ERP) of 45,000 watts.  The transmitter is located on Pinnacle Hill in Brighton.  It is co-located with the towers for several Rochester FM and TV stations.

History
On , the station signed on the air.  It broadcast from the new WXXI studios at 280 State Street in Rochester. 

While its initial format was a mixture of classical music, folk music, jazz, news and talk, WXXI-FM became a predominantly classical station after the 1975 format change of WBFB 92.5 from classical to all-news radio. WBFB donated its classical music library to WXXI-FM, and WBFB program director Simon Pontin soon joined WXXI-FM as its morning host.

On July 2, 1984, WXXI shifted most of its news programming, including NPR's Morning Edition and All Things Considered, to its new second service, WXXI (1370 AM). With the exception of some weekend and evening specialty programming, WXXI-FM became a full-time classical music service.

The station that is now WXXY originally signed on in 1979 as WJSL.  It was the college radio station of Houghton College. Houghton sold the station to WXXI in the late 1990s.

In 2007, WXXI-FM added HD Radio service, offering a simulcast of WXXI (AM) on its HD2 channel and a third service of news and information on its HD3 channel.

Programming

 WXXI-FM originates broadcasts of the Rochester Philharmonic Orchestra, hosted by Brenda Tremblay. 

 WXXI-FM also originates the national program With Heart and Voice, hosted first by the late Richard Gladwell and currently by Peter DuBois.  It features sacred choral and organ music.  

 Local live music broadcasts include Live from Hochstein and Backstage Pass.

References

External links

Classical music radio stations in the United States
XXI-FM
NPR member stations
Radio stations established in 1974
1974 establishments in New York (state)